Robert William Lamm (born October 13, 1944) is an American keyboardist, guitarist, singer and songwriter best known as a founding member of the rock band Chicago. He wrote many of the band's biggest hits, including "Questions 67 & 68", "Does Anybody Really Know What Time It Is?", "Beginnings", "25 or 6 to 4", "Saturday in the Park", "Dialogue (Part I & II)" and "Harry Truman". Lamm is one of three founding members (alongside James Pankow and Lee Loughnane) still performing with the group.

Biography

Lamm was born on October 13, 1944, in Brooklyn, New York City. His parents had a collection of jazz records, which were an early influence on him. As a youth, he performed in the boys' and men's choir at Grace Episcopal Church in Brooklyn Heights. Also in the choir was Harry Chapin. In a 2003 interview, Lamm said, "My first musical training came as a member of that choir. It exposed me to some of the great sacred music from the Middle Ages, right up through Bach and into the 20th century composers."

His mother eventually remarried, resulting in Lamm moving to Chicago, Illinois, when he was 15 years old. He studied art in high school, particularly drawing and painting, but changed direction in college by enrolling in the music program at Roosevelt University in Chicago.

In 1967, Lamm was one of the seven founding members of a "rock band with horns"—soon to be known as Chicago. After recording six overwhelmingly successful albums, in 1974, Lamm released Skinny Boy, the only solo album from a member of Chicago before the 1980s. Lamm seemingly drifted into a period of both personal and professional frustration. He emerged in 1982 with a new attitude.

A number of solo albums began to appear after Lamm relocated back to New York in 1991. He formed a trio (Beckley-Lamm-Wilson) with Gerry Beckley of the band America and Carl Wilson of The Beach Boys. After Wilson's death from lung cancer in February 1998, an album was released entitled Like a Brother (2000).

All of these solo albums and songs were in addition to the continued semi-active recordings by Chicago, Stone of Sisyphus, Night and Day, Chicago XXX, and Chicago Now 36.

Lamm has been a guest lecturer on music production at Stanford University. In 2012, he lectured at New York University on the subject of songwriting.

Instruments
In Chicago's early years, Lamm used a simple setup of Hammond organ and Wurlitzer Electric Piano. After the band's first tour of Europe, he began using a Hohner Pianet. Initially, his use of the grand piano was limited to the studio until he began to use one more regularly on stage, purchasing a Steinway Model D Concert Grand by the early 1970s. The Fender Rhodes electric piano became a favorite around 1972. Around 1973–1974 he added a Mellotron and Hohner clavinet in his keyboard rig, and also incorporated Moog and ARP synthesizers. In the late 1970s, he also started using the Yamaha CS-80 synthesizer and possibly a Sequential Circuits Prophet 5. According to an interview with Keyboard Magazine in 1979, he discovered that he no longer needed the Hammond organ after starting to play the CS80, so he retired it. On a 1980 TV appearance, he played a grand piano with a Multimoog synthesizer above it. He then accessed various synthesizer sound modules via MIDI keyboard controllers such as Yamaha, Kawai, Rhodes, and a Yamaha keytar. Beginning in the late 1980s, he began using the Lync LN1000 keytar. As his primary keyboard, these days, he prefers the Yamaha Motif ES8 keyboard.

Solo discography
 1974: Skinny Boy
 1993: Life Is Good in My Neighborhood
 1999: In My Head
 2000: Like a Brother (Beckley–Lamm–Wilson)
 2003: Subtlety & Passion
 2004: Too Many Voices (expanded reissue of In My Head)
 2005: Leap of Faith – Live in New Zealand
 2006: Life Is Good in My Neighborhood 2.0
 2006: Skinny Boy 2.0
 2008: The Bossa Project
 2012: Living Proof
 2012: Robert Lamm Songs: The JVE Remixes
 2017: Time Chill: A Retrospective

Personal life
Lamm was married to the late Karen Lamm Wilson (née Perk) from 1970 to 1971. He married second wife Julie Nini in 1976. They had one daughter, Sacha. They divorced in 1981. Lamm married his third wife, actress Alex Donnelley, in 1985. They had two daughters, Kate and Sean, before divorcing in 1991. He married his fourth wife Joy Kopko in 1991. They have no children.

References

External links
Chicago's official site

1944 births
Living people
American male singer-songwriters
American rock keyboardists
American rock songwriters
American rock singers
American baritones
Chicago (band) members
American organists
American male organists
Musicians from Brooklyn
Roosevelt University alumni
Keytarists
Singers from Chicago
Singer-songwriters from New York (state)
20th-century American pianists
American male pianists
21st-century American keyboardists
21st-century American pianists
21st-century organists
20th-century American male singers
20th-century American singers
21st-century American male musicians
20th-century American keyboardists
Singer-songwriters from Illinois